Sambucus sieboldiana, commonly called the Japanese red elder, is a deciduous shrub in the moschatel family (Adoxaceae). It is native to East Asia, where it is found in Japan and Korea. Its natural habitat is in thickets and forest edges, in low elevations. It is a common species throughout its range.

Description
Its leaves are opposite and pinnately compound, with 5-7 toothed leaflets. It produces a panicle of small white flowers in late spring, which are insect pollinated and hermaphroditic. Its fruits are ~4 mm long, red, and round. They are dispersed by birds.

Taxonomy
The Latin specific epithet sieboldiana refers to German physician and botanist Philipp Franz von Siebold (1796-1866). 

A closely related plant in China, Sambucus williamsii, was once included in Sambucus sieboldiana but is now classified as a separate species.

Toxins
Members of this genus are poisonous and the fruit has been known to cause stomach upsets in some people, but no records of this have been found for S. sieboldiana; any toxins that may be in the fruit would be destroyed upon cooking and would have a low toxicity.

References

sieboldiana
Flora of Eastern Asia
Plants described in 1909